Suffasia mahasumana, is a species of spider of the genus Suffasia. It is endemic to Sri Lanka.

See also
 List of Zodariidae species

References

Spiders described in 2000
Zodariidae
Endemic fauna of Sri Lanka
Spiders of Asia